Aspergillus leucocarpus is a species of fungus in the genus Aspergillus. It is from the Aspergillus section. The species was first described in 1969. It has been reported to produce an apolar indoloterpene, echinulins, epiheveadrides, and neoechinulins.

References 

leucocarpus
Fungi described in 1969